Six Bend Trap is a 2006 comedy crime film directed by Mike McCarthy. It is the first independent script to screen HD feature film, shot entirely in the Middlesbrough area with a couple of shots done at Peterborough Dog Track. Using a wide range of local actors in leading roles, completely funded by Ironopolis Film Company.

References

External links
 

2006 films
2000s crime comedy films
American crime comedy films
2006 comedy films
2000s English-language films
2000s American films